Cuniculotinus is a genus of flowering plants in the family Asteraceae.

Species
There is only one known species, Cuniculotinus gramineus.  It is native to the Great Basin deserts of California in Inyo County; and of southern Nevada in Nye, Lincoln, and Clark Counties.

References

Astereae
Monotypic Asteraceae genera
Flora of California
Flora of Nevada
Endemic flora of the United States
Flora without expected TNC conservation status